Bahar is a reformist newspaper published in Persian. The paper is based in Tehran, Iran.

History and profile
Bahar was established in May 2000. The managing editor of the paper was Saeed Pourazizi who served as director general of the Presidential Media Office when Mohammad Khatami was in office.

The daily has been banned for several times. It was banned on 9 August 2000. Following ten-year ban it was relaunched in January 2010. However, it was again closed down by the Press Supervisory Board on 19 April 2010 for "publishing items contrary to reality" and "creating doubt regarding major issues such as the elections." It was later republished. However, in October 2013 it was again closed down by Iran's state press watchdog due to the publication of an article which was regarded as undermining Islamic principles. The article which was written by religious–nationalist activist Asghar Gharavi also questioned the legitimacy of the supreme leader. It was the first publication banned in the country following the presidency of Hassan Rouhani.

References

External links

2000 establishments in Iran
Newspapers established in 2000
Newspapers published in Tehran
Persian-language newspapers